Gims: On the Record is a music documentary film released on September 17, 2020, produced by Netflix. The film tells about the career of Congolese hip-hop singer Gims in the last ten years, the running time is 1 hour 36 minutes.

References

External links 
 

Gims
2020 films
2020 documentary films
Netflix original documentary films